Joseph Alcide Simard (25 October 1907 – 21 December 1984) was a Canadian businessman and politician. Simard was a Ralliement créditiste member of the House of Commons of Canada.

Born in Saint-Léonard, Quebec, he was a life insurance agent by career. He was first elected at the Lac-Saint-Jean riding in the 1965 general election. After his only term in Parliament, Simard was defeated at Lac-Saint-Jean in the 1968 election by Marcel Lessard of the Liberal party.

References

External links
 

1907 births
1984 deaths
Members of the House of Commons of Canada from Quebec
People from Saint-Leonard, Quebec